Pugachevsky/Pugachyovsky (masculine), Pugachevskaya/Pugachyovskaya (feminine), or Pugachevskoye/Pugachyovskoye (neuter) is the name of several rural localities in Russia:
Pugachevsky, Chelyabinsk Oblast, a settlement in Sarafanovsky Selsoviet of Chebarkulsky District in Chelyabinsk Oblast
Pugachevsky, Orenburg Oblast, a settlement in Pugachevsky Selsoviet of Orenburgsky District in Orenburg Oblast
Pugachevsky, Saratov Oblast, a settlement in Pugachyovsky District of Saratov Oblast
Pugachevskaya, Arkhangelsk Oblast, a village in Rakulo-Kokshengsky Selsoviet of Velsky District in Arkhangelsk Oblast
Pugachevskaya, Volgograd Oblast, a stanitsa in Pugachevsky Selsoviet of Kotelnikovsky District in Volgograd Oblast

See also
Pugachyov, a town in Saratov Oblast, Russia